Orlow W. Chapman (1831 – 19 January 1890) was born in 1832, in Ellington, Connecticut,  though he made his life’s work and home in New York City. While in Ellington, Chapman received his primary education in a local academy. He then proceeded to graduate from Union College of Schenectady, New York, in 1854. After earning his undergraduate degree, he spent two years as Professor of Languages in the Fergusonville Academy in Delaware County. Chapman then studied law under Robert Parker of Binghamton, New York. In 1856, he was admitted to the bar.

He was District Attorney of Broome County from 1862 to 1867. He was a member of the New York State Senate (24th D.) from 1868 to 1871, sitting in the 91st, 92nd, 93rd and 94th New York State Legislatures. Subsequently, he was appointed Superintendent of New York State Insurance Department, where he served until 1876. During Chapman’s time as superintendent he also served as president of the National Insurance Commissioners’ Association and he focused on eliminating corrupt states’ fostering of large and fraudulent companies. During his term Chapman also initiated the creation of an Executive Committee formed from and elected by Insurance Superintendents from each state.

On May 29, 1889, President Harrison appointed Chapman Solicitor General of the United States.  His service was cut short when Chapman died of pneumonia on January 19, 1890, while working in Washington, D.C. Orlow W. Chapman was buried near his home in Binghamton, New York.

Footnotes

External links

1831 births
1890 deaths
New York (state) state senators
People from Ellington, Connecticut
Union College (New York) alumni
United States Solicitors General
Politicians from Binghamton, New York
19th-century American politicians
Lawyers from Binghamton, New York
Deaths from pneumonia in Washington, D.C.
19th-century American lawyers